The Afghanistan Volleyball Association (AVA) is the governing body of volleyball in Afghanistan.

The federation had called up a total 14 players for the 2014 Asian Games. 

In order to pick players for the national team as well as 'A team', the federation conducted a 10-day national volleyball tournament for both men's and women's.

References

External links 

 Afghanistan at FIVB

Volleyball
National men's volleyball teams
Volleyball in Afghanistan
Men's sport in Afghanistan